The Siskiyou Union High School District is a public secondary education school district in Siskiyou County, California.  There are presently five small rural high schools within the district, four of which are traditional secondary education facilities: Mt. Shasta High School, Weed High School, Happy Camp High School, and McCloud High School; the fifth, Jefferson High School is the district's continuation school.  District offices are located in Mount Shasta, California.

Enrollment at each of the district's schools is as follows:

References

External links
 Siskiyou Union High School District website

School districts in Siskiyou County, California
Mount Shasta, California (city)